Ichthus may refer to:

 An alternate spelling of ichthys (ΙΧΘΥΣ), the Greek word for fish.
 The Harvard Ichthus, a journal of Christian thought at Harvard University.
 Ichthus Music Festival, an annual Christian musicfest event in Wilmore, Kentucky, USA.
 Ichthus Christian Fellowship, a fellowship of churches in the United Kingdom and elsewhere.